Flocculation, in the field of chemistry, is a process by which colloidal particles come out of suspension to sediment under the form of floc or flake, either spontaneously or due to the addition of a clarifying agent. The action differs from precipitation in that, prior to flocculation, colloids are merely suspended, under the form of a stable dispersion (where the internal phase (solid) is dispersed throughout the external phase (fluid) through mechanical agitation) and are not truly dissolved in solution.

Coagulation and flocculation are important processes in water treatment with coagulation aimed to destabilize and aggregate particles through chemical interactions between the coagulant and colloids, and flocculation to sediment the destabilized particles by causing their aggregation into floc.

Term definition 
According to the IUPAC definition, flocculation is "a process of contact and adhesion whereby the particles of a dispersion form larger-size clusters". Flocculation 
is synonymous with agglomeration and coagulation / coalescence.

Basically, coagulation is a process of addition of coagulant to destabilize a stabilized charged particle. Meanwhile, flocculation is a mixing technique that promotes agglomeration and assists in the settling of particles. The most common used coagulant is alum, Al2(SO4)3·14H2O.

The chemical reaction involved:

Al2(SO4)3 · 14 H2O → 2 Al(OH)3 + 6 H+ + 3  + 8 H2O

During flocculation, gentle mixing accelerates the rate of particle collision, and the destabilized particles are further aggregated and enmeshed into larger precipitates. Flocculation is affected by several parameters, including mixing speeds, mixing intensity, and mixing time. The product of the mixing intensity and mixing time is used to describe flocculation processes.

Jar test 
The process by which the dosage and choice of flocculant are selected is called a jar test. The equipment used for jar testing consists of one or more beakers, each equipped with a paddle mixer. After the addition of flocculants, rapid mixing takes place, followed by slow mixing and later the sedimentation process. Samples can then be taken from the aqueous phase in each beaker.

Applications

Surface chemistry 
In colloid chemistry, flocculation refers to the process by which fine particulates are caused to clump together into a floc. The floc may then float to the top of the liquid (creaming), settle to the bottom of the liquid (sedimentation), or be readily filtered from the liquid. Flocculation behavior of soil colloids is closely 
related to freshwater quality. High dispersibility of soil colloids not only directly causes turbidity of the surrounding water but it also induces eutrophication due to the adsorption of nutritional substances in rivers
and lakes and even boats under the sea.

Physical chemistry 
For emulsions, flocculation describes clustering of individual dispersed droplets together, whereby the individual droplets do not lose their identity. Flocculation is thus the initial step leading to further ageing of the emulsion (droplet coalescence and the ultimate separation of the phases). Flocculation is used in mineral dressing, but can be also used in the design of physical properties of food and pharmaceutical products.

Medical Diagnostics 
In a medical laboratory, flocculation is the core principle used in various diagnostic tests, for example the rapid plasma reagin test.

Civil engineering/earth sciences 
In civil engineering, and in the earth sciences, flocculation is a condition in which clays, polymers or other small charged particles become attached and form a fragile structure, a floc. In dispersed clay slurries,
flocculation occurs after mechanical agitation ceases and the dispersed clay platelets spontaneously form flocs because of attractions between negative face charges and positive edge charges.

Biology 

Flocculation is used in biotechnology applications in conjunction with microfiltration to improve the efficiency of biological feeds. The addition of synthetic flocculants to the bioreactor can increase the average particle size making microfiltration more efficient. When flocculants are not added, cakes form and accumulate causing low cell viability. Positively charged flocculants work better than negatively charged ones since the cells are generally negatively charged.

Cheese industry 
Flocculation is widely employed to measure the progress of curd formation in the initial stages of cheese making to determine how long the curds must set. The reaction involving the rennet micelles are modeled by Smoluchowski kinetics. During the renneting of milk the micelles can approach one another and flocculate, a process that involves hydrolysis of molecules and macropeptides.

Flocculation is also used during cheese wastewater treatment. Three different coagulants are mainly used:
 FeSO4  (Iron(II) sulfate)
 Al2(SO4)3 (Aluminium sulfate)
 FeCl3 (Iron(III) chloride)

Brewing 

In the brewing industry flocculation has a different meaning. It is a very important process in fermentation during the production of beer where cells form macroscopic flocs. These flocs cause the yeast to sediment or rise to the top of a fermentation at the end of the fermentation. Subsequently, the yeast can be collected (cropped) from the top (ale fermentation) or the bottom (lager fermentation) of the fermenter in order to be reused for the next fermentation. 

Yeast flocculation is primarily determined by the calcium concentration, often in the 50-100ppm range.  Calcium salts can be added to cause flocculation, or the process can be reversed by removing calcium by adding phosphate to form insolubable calcium phosphate, adding excess sulfate to form insoluble calcium sulfate, or adding EDTA to chelate the calcium ions. While it appears similar to sedimentation in colloidal dispersions, the mechanisms are different.

Water treatment process 
Flocculation and sedimentation are widely employed in the purification of drinking water as well as in sewage treatment, storm-water treatment and treatment of industrial wastewater streams. Typical treatment processes consist of grates, coagulation, flocculation, sedimentation, granular filtration and disinfection.

Deflocculation 

Deflocculation is the exact opposite of flocculation, also sometimes known as peptization. Sodium silicate (Na2SiO3) is a typical example. Usually in higher pH ranges in addition to low ionic strength of solutions and domination of monovalent metal cations the colloidal particles can be dispersed.
The additive that prevents the colloids from forming flocs is called a deflocculant. For deflocculation imparted through electrostatic barriers, the efficacy of a deflocculant can be gauged in terms of zeta potential. According to the Encyclopedic Dictionary of Polymers deflocculation is "a state or condition of a dispersion of a solid in a liquid in which each solid particle remains independent and unassociated with adjacent particles (much like emulsifier). A deflocculated suspension shows zero or very low yield value".

Deflocculation can be a problem in wastewater treatment plants as it commonly causes sludge settling problems and deterioration of the effluent quality.

See also 

 
 
 
 
  (stability of colloids)

References

Further reading 
 John Gregory (2006), Particles in water: properties and processes, Taylor & Francis, 
 John C. Crittenden, R. Rhodes Trussell, David W. Hand, Kerry J. Howe, George Tchobanoglous (2012), MWH's water treatment: principles and design, third edition, John Wiley & Sons, 

Metallurgy
Chemical processes
Separation processes
Sewerage
Water treatment

ja:凝析